The following is a list of sketches which debuted on The Late Show with Stephen Colbert on CBS.

Recurring solo sketches

Current
Cold Open: An opening sketch, often featuring an actual news story, but with fake network logos (often parodying CNN, Fox News, MSNBC, ABC News, C-SPAN, or PBS NewsHour), followed by a comic segment parodying the story. Sometimes the sketch is a song parody.
Covetton House: Covetton House is Colbert's take on celebrity luxury brands, especially Gwyneth Paltrow's Goop. Each sketch typically features everyday products with fancy names and jacked-up prices. Some items are available for sale at Goop's website, with all proceeds going to charity.
Cyborgasm:
First Drafts: Colbert invites a member of the audience up to read holiday/special event cards and their "first drafts", which poke fun at the event in question. Since the COVID-19 pandemic, Colbert's wife Evelyn McGee took the place of the audience member.
Meanwhile: Colbert jokes about lesser-known news and stories, such as Philadelphia Flyers' new mascot Gritty and Buffalo Wild Wings' new BBQ pumpkin spice wings, that he couldn't fit into the monologue. The segment always starts with an elaborate metaphor explaining the segment. In the period during the COVID-19 pandemic when the show was not taped in the Ed Sullivan Theater, it was called "Quarantinewhile".
Seditionist Round Up Roundup: Colbert details the latest arrests of rioters from the 2021 storming of the United States Capitol. Segment opens with a cow named Bessie making cow-themed puns about the rioters.
Space News: A segment of the opening monologue telling jokes related to space.
Stephen Colbert Is Short And Punchy: Colbert answers video questions submitted by children. The sketch begins and ends with Colbert complaining about the title. (The sketch has had other titles, including Stephen Takes Your Kids, Stephen's Re-Education Camp, Stephen Colbert Is Watching Your Children, and Stephen Doesn't Care About Your Kids.)

Former
America: Endgame: Stephen covers the 2020 Democratic and Republican National Conventions. The title and intro are a parody of Avengers: Endgame, with Democrats and Republicans as Marvel superheroes and supervillains (particularly Donald Trump as Thanos), respectively.
Bedtime Stories: On occasion when Colbert has an author on the show, he ends the episode by asking the author to read him a bedtime story. Authors who performed the sketch with Colbert include Jonathan Franzen and John Irving.
The Big Furry Hat: Colbert dons a giant hat that comes down from the ceiling and makes a series of humorous proclamations that people must follow (e.g., "Actor Paul Rudd must begin aging like the rest of us"). On November 13, 2015, John Cleese joined him wearing a bigger and furrier hat.
Brain Fight With Tuck Buckford: During the child custody trial of InfoWars host Alex Jones, Colbert introduced a new right-wing pundit character by the name of Tuck Buckford as the host of a fictional show titled "Brain Fight" beginning with the April 17, 2017 episode. The sketches are based on infamous segments of Jones' radio show which have Colbert parodying his over-the-top style of reporting, mocking his conspiracy theories, including certain personal aspects of Jones' life based on testimonies from the court trial.
Cargo Unchained: A monologue segment discussing the recent shortages of worldwide consumer products, named after the film Django Unchained.
Cartoon Donald Trump: In the March 30, 2016 episode, Colbert declared that based on his behavior in the presidential debates and town halls, Donald Trump had become a "cartoonish version of himself". In response, Colbert interviewed a "slightly less cartoonish" version of Trump—an animated caricature of him portrayed with a childish demeanor. The character was designed by Tim Luecke, voiced by Brian Stack, and is controlled using Adobe Character Animator—which allows Colbert to interact with the character in real-time. Late Show tested the technology with a character of Colbert's "Irish ancestor" (which was intended for, but cut from a St. Patrick's Day episode), and a sketch involving a cartoon bluebird who supported Bernie Sanders (in reference to a Sanders rally in Portland, Oregon where a bird landed on his podium). After Bill Clinton stated in his 2016 Democratic National Convention speech that the Republicans had created a "cartoon" version of her, Colbert introduced Cartoon Hillary Clinton. Both Cartoon Trump and Cartoon Clinton have made appearances as recurring characters in later episodes, and Cartoon Trump was featured in an animated short during Colbert's election night special for Showtime. Showtime later announced that Colbert would executive produce a satirical animated series based on the sketches; the series, Our Cartoon President, premiered in January 2018.
Chopper Talk/Chair Chat: In "Chopper Talk," Colbert discusses Trump's interviews in front of an operating Marine One helicopter. The spinoff "Chair Chat" focuses on interviews where Trump is sitting down.
Disinformation Station:
Doin' It Donkey Style: Stephen covers 2020 Democratic candidates for President. The segment begins with two animated flag-colored donkeys saying a one-line summary of a Democratic policy position (like "equal pay").
Don and the Giant Impeach: Stephen covers the first impeachment of Donald Trump. The segment begins with Trump saying a one-line summary of his position (like "witch hunt") as he runs away from a giant peach, parodying James and the Giant Peach. The sketch has been reprised as "Don and the Giant Impeach 2: Go Fast, We're Furious" as Stephen covers the second impeachment of Donald Trump following the storming of the United States Capitol on January 6, 2021.
Fury Road to the White House 2020: Updates on the 2020 United States presidential election. The name and intro are a parody of Mad Max: Fury Road.
Gaetz Gate: Updates on the controversies surrounding Florida Representative Matt Gaetz.
Goin' Viral/Catch a Third Wave: Endless Bummer These segments provided updates on the COVID-19 pandemic. Originally titled "Goin' Viral," it was renamed "Catch a Third Wave" in the fall of 2020, and given an animated opening with a cartoon coronavirus on a surfboard.
The Hungry for Power Games: In a parody of The Hunger Games, Colbert dresses up as a version of Caesar Flickerman and mocks a candidate that has dropped out of the race from the 2016 United States presidential election. The sketch has occasionally been reprised as "The Hungry To Leave Power Games", mocking departing members of the Trump administration such as Rex Tillerson and Scott Pruitt.
The Late Show Figure-It-Out-a-Tron: In a parody of Glenn Beck's use of chalkboards, Colbert brings out a chalkboard with names of people implicated in an ongoing scandal written all over it. He then tries to figure out the links between these people by drawing lines connecting their names. These lines form a humorous and often crude drawing related to the scandal, such as a penis or swastika.
Midnight Confessions: Colbert examines his conscience to his audience. He starts with a disclaimer that while the things that he confesses are not technically sins, he still feels guilty about them. Done from a fake confessional. Its popularity resulted in a book being written based on it.
The Mono-Log: Colbert gives updates related to the 2020 appearance of an unidentified monolith in the Utah desert and other monoliths around the world
Piano 1-0-Fun! with Jon Batiste: Jon Batiste hosts absurd instructional videos.
The Q Files:
Real News Tonight: A parody of television newscasts, anchored by "Jim Anchorton" (John Thibodeaux) and "Jill Newslady" (Jen Spyra), that consists entirely of overly-positive fake stories designed to praise Donald Trump. In August 2017, when Trump's daughter-in-law Lara Trump began producing Real News Update videos that similarly presented positive coverage of Trump, Colbert presented an edition of Real News Tonight which interspersed clips of Real News Update to make Lara interact with the Jill and Jim characters as a "special correspondent". On June 18, 2019, the Jill and Jim characters attended a rally launching Trump's 2020 re-election campaign at the Amway Center in Orlando, interviewing supporters for a segment that aired on the June 20 episode. Their press credentials had been revoked at the last minute, but they still managed to make it inside the event by registering online (a process which also exposed exaggerated claims surrounding the attendance of the rally).
The Road From The White House: Stephen covers Trump's post-election litigation and Biden's presidential transition plans after the 2020 presidential election. The segment begins with a President Trump cartoon, while still claiming victory, being taken out of the White House by cartoons of Joe Biden and Kamala Harris. Biden and Harris are wearing protective gear and spraying the President cartoon with "VOTE" aerosol spray bottles.
Romansplaining with Stephen Colbert: A segment similar to "Meanwhile", focusing on stories dealing with relationships and romance. The title is a portmanteau of "romance" and "mansplaining".
Slams: Colbert will joke about a particular item in his monologue, do a dance (to an excerpt from the Deee-Lite hit "Groove Is in the Heart"), and then a stamp-like logo comes on-screen with the slam message and a deep voice reading it off.
Stephen Talks with God: Colbert talks with God, as portrayed as an animated character projected on the ceiling of the Ed Sullivan Theater.
The Vax-Scene: Updates on efforts to deliver the COVID-19 vaccine to as many people as possible. The segment begins with cartoon syringes singing parodies of famous musical numbers imploring viewers to get vaccinated.
WERD: Colbert chooses a word or phrase as a theme for a rant on a topical subject or news item while humorous captions displayed in a sidebar either highlight or sarcastically undercut what he is saying. The segment is based on "The Wørd", a segment Colbert performed throughout the entire run of The Colbert Report. Colbert introduced The Wørd segment on The Late Show on July 18, 2016. During the July 27, 2016 episode, Colbert indirectly stated Comedy Central had objected to his use of elements from the Report on Late Show; subsequently, the segment has been done under the name "WERD".
Wheel of News: Colbert spins a wheel with random topics of news to talk about. Based on Wheel of Fortune

Recurring sketches with guests

Big Questions with Even Bigger Stars
Colbert and a guest sit under the stars and have absurd conversations about topics. Such conversations include killing baby Hitler, what Santa does the rest of the year, and whether they would rather have feet for hands or hands for feet.

Guests Performed with
 Scarlett Johansson (September 9, 2015)
 Tom Hanks (September 30, 2015)
 Bryan Cranston (November 6, 2015)
 Jennifer Lawrence (December 14, 2015)
 Will Smith (August 2, 2016)
 Kermit the Frog (February 1, 2016)
 Samuel L. Jackson (June 29, 2016)
 Mel Gibson (November 1, 2016)
 Ryan Reynolds (March 21, 2017)
 Brad Pitt (May 16, 2017)
 Nicole Kidman (November 1, 2017)
 Justin Timberlake (November 29. 2017)
 Benedict Cumberbatch (May 18, 2018)
 Matthew McConaughey (January 23, 2019)

The Colbert Questionert
The Questionert (pronounced "questionnaire") is a series of 15 questions designed to get to know celebrities. They include "What is your least favorite smell?", "What number am I (Colbert) thinking of?", and "Describe the rest of your life in five words". Many of these are pre-recorded and aired on special Friday episodes.

Guests Performed with
 Tom Hanks (January 2021)
 Meryl Streep (January 2021)
 George Clooney (January 2021)
 Tiffany Haddish (February 2021)
 Billy Crystal (March 2021)
John Oliver (April 2021)
Jane Fonda (April 2021)
Ringo Starr (April 2021)
John Krasinski (May 2021)
Seth Rogen (June 2021)
Neil deGrasse Tyson (September 2021)
Jon Stewart (September 2021)
Bruce Springsteen (October 2021)
Jeff Goldblum (November 2021)
Sting (November 2021)
Jennifer Lawrence (December 2021)
Keanu Reeves (December 2021)
Bradley Cooper (January 2022)
Martha Stewart (February 2022)
Sandra Bullock (March 2022)
Daniel Craig (May 2022)
Josh Brolin (May 2022)
Shaquille O'Neal (May 2022)
Jon Batiste (June 2022)
Cate Blanchett (November 2022)

Community Calendar
Colbert and a guest host a community calendar of events in the guest's hometown. Based from Colbert's special appearance at Only in Monroe, a local public access program in Monroe, Michigan, with Eminem as his guest.

Guests Performed with
 Jeff Daniels—Chelsea, Michigan (March 11, 2016)
 Nick Offerman—Minooka, Illinois (April 4, 2016)
 Aaron Paul—McCall, Idaho (June 17, 2016)
 Adam Driver—Mishawaka, Indiana (January 5, 2017)
 John Oliver—Bedford of Bedfordshire, England (February 7, 2017)
 James Marsden—Stillwater, Oklahoma (April 20, 2018)
 Melissa McCarthy—Plainfield, Illinois (May 11, 2018)
 Aubrey Plaza—Wilmington, Delaware (June 14, 2019)
 Ty Burrell—Grants Pass, Oregon (March 6, 2020)
 John Mulaney—The Internet (May 1, 2020)

Family Meeting
Colbert and his lead guest hold a family meeting in character as the concerned "parents" of the US.

Guests Performed with
 William H. Macy (November 19, 2016)
 Joe Biden (December 7, 2016)
 Leslie Mann (January 31, 2017)
 Nick Kroll (September 28, 2017)
 Tom Hanks (June 16, 2022)
 Michelle Obama (November 14, 2022)

Personal Space
Colbert and a guest talk in Colbert's "personal space"—a cardboard box, labeled "Personal Space," just big enough for their heads and the camera.

Guests Performed with
 Tom Hanks (December 12, 2017)
John Oliver (February 10, 2018)
Seth Rogen (June 22, 2018)
Steve Carell (February 3, 2019)
 Conan O'Brien (May 24, 2019)
 Ricky Gervais (July 27, 2019)

Rescue Dog Rescue
Colbert and his lead guest try to help find homes for dogs up for adoption by making up stories about them (such as claiming one dog knows the lyrics to the Frozen song "Let It Go", but will not sing them).

Guests Performed with
 Aubrey Plaza (February 2017)
 Bryan Cranston (March 2017)
 Jim Parsons (May 2017)
 Ellie Kemper (August 2017)
 Billy Eichner (October 2017)
 Nick Jonas (December 2017)
 Whoopi Goldberg (2018)
 Emilia Clarke (April 2019)
 Tom Holland (June 2019) 
Jason Sudeikis (August 2021) 
John Oliver (February 2022) 
Source:

Just One Question
Members of Colbert's staff each ask one question to a celebrity.

References

Sketches
Late Show with Stephen Colbert
Late Show with Stephen Colbert